Lincoln County High School (LCHS) is a high school located in Fayetteville, Tennessee.  The school was first opened for the 1979-1980 school year with the first graduating class in 1980.  The high school is located at 1233 Huntsville Highway, Fayetteville, TN 37334.  LCHS serves grades 9-12.  The school mascot has been the Falcon since its opening.

Overview
Lincoln County, Tennessee is a small rural county nestled among the picturesque hills and valleys near the Tennessee-Alabama state line. The major 64 highway runs East and West through the small town of Fayetteville connecting Interstates 65 and 24.

Fayetteville maintains a small town atmosphere while residents enjoy traveling to nearby Nashville, Tennessee and Huntsville, Alabama for "big city" opportunities for shopping and entertainment. Lincoln County is an agricultural community with several large factories providing job opportunities for its citizens. Fayetteville has a local branch of Motlow State Community College. Many students start taking college classes as dual/joint enrollment while attending Lincoln County High School. Lincoln County High School is located in the business district on the main thoroughfare through town. It is surrounded by restaurants and shopping areas.

LCHS has been known as "the high school" since its inception in 1979. Living in a small community with financial limitations, LCHS faces challenges with dropout rates and a lack of job opportunities for graduates as most small town schools, but with the introduction of the Tennessee Promise, students have an opportunity to improve their career advancement with a college degree.

History
When Lincoln County opened its doors in 1979 as a comprehensive high school, all students were brought to one location to experience educational opportunities that would not have been possible at the smaller community high schools.

In 2002, the Lincoln County Board of Education took the challenge to reorganize the schools in the county. All schools became Kindergarten through eighth grades with all ninth graders entering the newly implemented Ninth Grade Academy. Several years ago, the Fayetteville City School System added a high school with the first graduating class in 2014.

Riverside Christian School also added a high school a few years ago. Both schools are located within a three-mile radius of Lincoln County High School. LCHS is the largest of the schools and citizens and businesses now support all three schools.

Demographics
Lincoln County High School has 120 support and professional staff. The school population is 91.2% Caucasian, 5.5% African American, 2.1% Hispanic, and less than 1% Native American. The special needs students are at 9.7%, with less than 2% comprising CDC students.

The number of economically disadvantaged students make up 42% of the school population. Lincoln County High School's staff strive for high academic expectations. Lincoln County High School and Ninth Grade Academy work together every year to revise and implement improved transition plans for the freshman.

Notable alumni
 Ricky Blake, former NFL and CFL player
 Lamar Divens, former NFL player
 Kelly Holcomb, former NFL player
 Anthony Shelton, former NFL and CFL player

References

External links
 Lincoln County High School

Public high schools in Tennessee
Education in Lincoln County, Tennessee
Buildings and structures in Lincoln County, Tennessee